Dylan Wissing is an American drummer, percussionist and composer.

Biography 
Wissing is best known for playing the "big drums" on Alicia Keys' Grammy Award-winning Number One Hit "Girl on Fire. Besides recording records with artists such as Drake, Kanye West, Eminem and Jay-Z, he was a constant member of the bands Skidmore Fountain and Johnny Socko. Dylan features on drums on  Emmet Glascott track 'The War'   The more he has worked with Maybach Music Group, Just Blaze and Saigon. Wissing's song credits include 4 Grammy Award-nominations and 2 wins to date.

Discography 
 1994 - Johnny Socko - Bovaquarium
 1996 - Johnny Socko - Oh I Do Hopte It's the Roast Beef
 1997 - Johnny Socko - Full Trucker Effect
 1999 - Johnny Socko - Quatro
 2001 - Johnny Socko - Double Live
 2002 - Johnny Socko - Johnny Socko
 2006 - Skidmore Fountain - Skidmore Fountain
 2007 - Skidmore Fountain - Break
 2011 - Jay-Z - Watch The Throne
 2011 - Maybach Music Group - Self Made Vol. 1
 2011 - Drake - Take Care
 2012 - Alicia Keys - Girl on Fire
 2013 - Kanye West - Yeezus
 2014 - Eminem - Shady XV

References

External links 
 indiestudiodrummer.com Official Site

American drummers
Living people
Year of birth missing (living people)